Sara Seale, was the pseudonym by Mary Jane MacPherson (d. ) and/or A.D.L. MacPherson (d. ), a British writing team of over 45 romance novels as  from 1932 to 1971. Seale was one of the first Mills & Boon's authors published in Germany and the Netherlands. By the 1950s Seale was earning over £3,000/year.

Biography
Mary Jane MacPherson began writing at an early age while still in her convent school. Besides being a writer, MacPherson was also a leading authority on Alsatian dogs, and was a judge at Crufts.

Bibliography

Single novels
Beggars May Sing (1932)
Grace Before Meat (1932)
Chase the Moon (1933)
Summer Spell (1937)
This Merry Bond (1938)
Spread Your Wings (1939)  My Heart's Desire
Green Grass Growing (1940)
Barn Dance (1941) a.k.a. Queen of Hearts
Stormy Petrel (1941)
The Silver Sty (1942)
House of Glass (1944) a.k.a. Maggy
Folly to Be Wise (1946)
The Reluctant Orphan (1947) a.k.a. Orphan Bride
The English Tutor (1948)
The Gentle Prisoner (1949)
These Delights (1949)
The Young Amanda (1950)
Then She Fled Me (1950)
The Dark Stranger (1951)
Wintersbride (1951)
The Lordly One (1952)
The Forbidden Island (1953)
Turn to the West (1953)
The Truant Spirit (1954)
Time of Grace (1955)
Child Friday (1956)
Sister to Cinderella (1956)
I Know My Love (1957)
Trevallion (1957)
Lucy Lamb (1958) a.k.a. Lucy Lamb, Doctor's Wife
Charity Child (1959)
Dear Dragon (1959)
Cloud Castle (1960)
The Only Charity (1961)
The Reluctant Landlord (1962)
Valentine's Day (1962)
By Candlelight (1963)
The Youngest Bridesmaid (1963)
The Third Uncle (1964)
To Catch a Unicorn (1964)
Green Girl (1965)
The Truant Bride (1966)
Penny Plain (1967)
That Young Person (1969)
Dear Professor (1970)
Mr. Brown (1971) a.k.a. The Unknown Mr. Brown

Author's omnibus collections
Green Girl / Penny Plain / Queen Of Hearts (Harlequin Omnibus 9) (1975)
Young Amanda / Truant Bride / Beggars May Sing (1983)

Anthologies in collaboration
Do Something Dangerous / Youngest Bridesmaid / Doctor David Advises (1964) (with Elizabeth Hoy and Hilary Wilde)
Surgeon's Marriage / The Only Charity / The Golden Peaks (1964) (with Kathryn Blair, Eleanor Farnes)
Mountain Clinic / Forbidden Island / Dear Fugitive (1971) (with Elizabeth Hoy, Jean S. MacLeod)
Orphan Bride / Full Tide / House in the Timberwoods (1971) (with Celine Conway, Joyce Dingwell)
Then She Fled Me / Castle in Corsica / Scatterbrains-Student Nurse (1971) (with Margaret Malcolm and Anne Weale)
Wintersbride / Marriage Compromise / Tamarisk Bay (1972) (with Kathryn Blair, Margaret Malcolm)
Children's Nurse / Heart Specialist / Child Friday (1972) (Susan Barrie and Kathryn Blair)
Harlequin Golden Library Vol. XLI: Over The Blue Mountains, Summer Lightning, Lucy Lamb, Doctor's Wife (1973) (with Mary Burchell and Jill Tahourdin)
Masquerade / Rata Flowers Are Red / Unknown Mr. Brown (1977) (with Anne Mather, Mary Moore)
Master of Comus / My Heart's Desire / Flight Into Yesterday (1983) (with Charlotte Lamb and Margaret Way)

References and sources

                   

British romantic fiction writers
Year of birth missing
Place of birth missing
Place of death missing